Colonial Conference may refer to:

Colonial Conference (New Jersey), a New Jersey high school sports league
Colonial Athletic Association, an NCAA Division I athletic conference
Colonial Hills Conference, a New Jersey high school sports league
Colonial States Athletic Conference, an NCAA Division III athletic conference
Colonial Valley Conference, a New Jersey high school sports league
Imperial Conference (also called "Colonial Conference") meetings of heads of governments in the British Empire